This is a discography of the krautrock band Can.

Studio albums

Monster Movie (1969)
Tago Mago (1971)
Ege Bamyasi  (1972)
Future Days    (1973)
Soon Over Babaluma (1974)
Landed (1975)
Flow Motion (1976)
Saw Delight (1977)
Out of Reach (1978)
Can (1979)
Rite Time (1989)

Compilations and live albums
Soundtracks (1970, compilation of songs written for various films)
 Limited Edition (United Artists, 1974) – collection of 1968–1974 rarities that was expanded to become Unlimited Edition
 Unlimited Edition (Virgin, UK/Harvest, Ger., 1976) – collection of 1968–1975 rarities
 Opener (Sunset, 1976) – compilation from 1972–1974 album material
 Cannibalism (United Artists, 1978) – compilation from 1969–1974 album material (two tracks dropped for CD reissue)
 Delay 1968 (Spoon, 1981) – unreleased material from 1968–1969
 InCANdescence (Virgin, 1981) – compilation from 1969–1977 album material
 Cannibalism 2 (Spoon, 1992) – compilation from 1974–1981 album material, also includes a two tracks from singles and one unreleased track, "Melting Away" 
 Anthology (Spoon, 1994) – compilation from 1968–1991 album and soundtrack material
 Cannibalism 3 (Spoon, 1993) – compilation from 1979–1991 solo album material
 The Peel Sessions (Strange Fruit, 1995) – collection of 1973–1975 recordings from BBC radio's John Peel Show
 Sacrilege (Spoon, 1997) – remix album, contains a remix of the hit "Spoon" by Sonic Youth
 Can Live Music (Live 1971–1977) (Spoon, 1999) – collection of live recordings 1972–1977 (originally packaged with the Can Box CD/video/book set)
 Agilok & Blubbo (Wah Wah Records Supersonic Sounds, 2009) – movie soundtrack recorded in 1968, recorded as The Inner Space
 Kamasutra: Vollendung Der Liebe (Crippled Dick Hot Wax!, 2009) – movie soundtrack recorded in 1968, released as Irmin Schmidt & Inner Space Production
 The Lost Tapes (Mute, 2012) – 3-CD or 5-LP box set compilation of unreleased studio and live recordings from 1968 to 1977 (UK #77)
 The Singles (Mute, 2017) – CD or 3-LP compilation of all the singles (UK #83)
 Live in Stuttgart 1975 (Spoon/Mute, 2021) – CD or 3-LP or digital
 Live in Brighton 1975 (Spoon/Mute, 2021) – CD or 3-LP or digital
 Live in Cuxhaven 1976 (Spoon/Mute, 2022) – CD or LP or digital

Bootlegs
 Mother Sky (Asteroid, 1993) - live Waldbühne, West-Berlin June 1971
 Horrortrip in the Paperhouse: Live 1972/73 (1994).
 Radio Waves (Sonic Platten, 1997) – collection of 1969–1972 live and rare recordings
 Zhengzheng Rikang (Nörvenich, 2006) – early 1969 bootleg

Singles 
 "Agilok & Blubbo" {Can as The Inner Space} / "Kamera Song"  {Rosemarie Heinikel}   (Deutsche Vogue, DV 14785 – 1968)
 "Kama Sutra" {Irmin Schmidt with The Inner Space}  / "I'm Hiding my Nightingale"  {Margarete Juvan} (Metronome,  M 25128 – November 1968)
 "Soul Desert" / "She Brings The Rain" (Liberty 15 340, 1970)
 "Turtles Have Short Legs"/"Halleluhwah" (Liberty, March 1971)
 "Spoon"/"Shikaku Maru Ten" (United Artists, December 1971)
 "Vitamin C"/"I'm So Green" (United Artists, 1972)
 "Moonshake"/"Splash" (United Artists, October 1973)
 "Dizzy Dizzy"/"Come Sta La Luna" (United Artists, December 1974)
 "Hunters and Collectors"/"Vernal Equinox" (Virgin, 1975)
 "I Want More"/"..and More" (Virgin, July 1976) (reached No 26 in UK, October 1976)
 "Silent Night"/"Cascade Waltz" (Virgin, November 1976)
 "Don't Say No"/"Return" (Virgin, April 1977)
 "Can-Can"/"Can Be" (Lightning, June 1978)
 "Can-Can"/"Aspectacle" (Harvest, 1979)
 "Hoolah Hoolah" (Double-Mix)/"Hoolah Hoolah" (Sun Electric Mix) (Phonogram, 1990)
 "I Want More"/"..and More" (Spoon, 2006 reissue)

Appearances on compilations 
Compilation albums or albums by other artists containing previously unreleased Can tracks. 
 Electric Rock Idee 2000 (Liberty/United Artists, 1970) – "Thief"; different edit appears later on Delay 1968
 Until the End of the World. Music from the Motion Picture Soundtrack (Warner Bros. Records, 1991) – "Last Night Sleep"
 Pop 2000. Das Gibt's Nur Einmal (Grönland Records, 1999) – "Der Dritte Mann"
 Irmin Schmidt: Villa Wunderbar (Spoon Records, 2013) – "Alice – Remix" and "Last Night Sleep – Remix"

Film and video 

 (1970) "Mein schönes kurzes Leben"  (TV-Movie by )
 (1971) Beat Club TV (performance of Paperhouse)
 (1972) Free Concert
 (1973) Mixed Media In Soest
 (1998) The Can Documentary
 (1999) The Can Box (Box set including Can Documentary, Free Concert, Two Live CDs and a book)
 (2004) The Can DVD (2 DVDs with CAN material and 1 Audio CD with the solo material)
 (2022) Can and Me

Soundtracks 

 (1968) Agilok & Blubbo
 (1968) Kamasutra: Vollendung Der Liebe
 (1969) 
 (1969) 
 (1970) Das Millionenspiel
 (1970) Deadlock
 (1970) Deep End
 (1970) 
 (1970) Cream – Schwabing-Report
 (1970) Mein schönes kurzes Leben
 (1971) 
 (1972) Tatort – Dead Pigeon on Beethoven Street
 (1974) The Last Days of Gomorrah
 (1974) Alice in the Cities
 (1975) Eurogang
 (1979) Als Diesel geboren
 (1991) Until the End of the World

Non-original soundtracks
 (2002) Morvern Callar
 (2010) Norwegian Wood
 (2014) Inherent Vice

References

Can (band)
Discographies of German artists
Rock music group discographies